Rachel Held Evans (née Rachel Grace Held; June 8, 1981 – May 4, 2019) was an American Christian columnist, blogger and author. Her book A Year of Biblical Womanhood was a New York Times bestseller in e-book non-fiction, and Searching for Sunday was a New York Times bestseller nonfiction paperback.

Early life and education 
Evans was born in Alabama to Robin and Peter Held and spent her early years in Birmingham, Alabama. When she was 14, she and her family moved to Dayton, Tennessee, where her father took an administrative position at Bryan College. She attended Rhea County High School, then went to Bryan College where she majored in English literature. She received her Bachelor of Arts degree in 2003.

Career 
After graduating from college, Evans moved to Chattanooga, Tennessee, to intern for the Chattanooga Times Free Press.

In 2004, Evans returned to Dayton where she worked full-time for The Herald-News, the local paper. In 2006, she switched from full-time employment to writing pro bono as the paper's humor columnist; in 2007, she won an award for Best Personal Humor Column from the Tennessee Press Association. She continued to write freelance articles for national publications and began to blog.

In September 2008, Evans signed with Zondervan for her first book, Evolving in Monkey Town. The book explores her journey from religious certainty to a faith which accepts doubt and questioning; the title is based on the Scopes Monkey Trial that took place in Dayton. Her second book, A Year of Biblical Womanhood: How a Liberated Woman Found Herself Sitting on Her Roof, Covering Her Head, and Calling Her Husband Master, was published in October 2012. She recounts how she spent an entire year of living a Biblical lifestyle literally. The book also garnered national media attention for Evans as she appeared on The Today Show. In 2014, Evans re-released Evolving in Monkey Town with the new title of Faith Unraveled.

In 2015, she wrote a column in The Washington Post: "Want millennials back in the pews? Stop trying to make church 'cool.'" In the column she self-identified as a millennial and expressed her belief that churches attempting to attract more millennials were wrong in their approach because they focused primarily on stylistic aspects of the church experience, which "are not the key to drawing millennials back to God in a lasting and meaningful way. Young people don't simply want a better show."

In early August 2016, Evans published an editorial for Vox defending her "pro-life Christian" position and support for Democratic presidential nominee Hillary Clinton in the 2016 U.S. presidential election.

In 2018, Held Evans and Sarah Bessey co-founded the Evolving Faith Conference, an annual gathering of young progressive Christians. They expected about 200 people to attend the first conference in Montreat, North Carolina, and had 1,400 attend. Jeff Chu joined them as co-organizer for the October 2019 conference, which became "in part a consolation for readers, friends and devotees of Rachel Held Evans" after her death in May of that year.

Death 
Evans was placed in a medically induced coma in April 2019 following an allergic reaction to medication for an infection. By May 2, "severe swelling of the brain" worsened her condition, and she died on May 4.

Personal life 
In 2003, Evans married her college boyfriend, Dan Evans. The couple had two children. She was an Episcopalian who attended St. Luke's Episcopal Church in Cleveland, Tennessee. At the time of her death, she no longer considered herself to be an evangelical due to the movement's close association with the Christian right in the United States.

Legacy 
Emma Green, writing for The Atlantic, notes that Evans "was part of a vanguard of progressive-Christian women who fought to change the way Christianity is taught and perceived in the United States." Green goes on to argue that Evans' legacy is  "her unwillingness to cede ownership of Christianity to its traditional conservative-male stewards" and that her "very public, vulnerable exploration of a faith forged in doubt empowered a ragtag band of writers, pastors, and teachers to claim their rightful place as Christians."

Books 
 , republished as

References

External links 
 
 March 2015 Interview with Rachel Held Evans in The Englewood Review of Books
 
 
 

1981 births
2019 deaths
21st-century American Episcopalians
21st-century American non-fiction writers
21st-century American women writers
21st-century Christians
American Christian writers
American bloggers
American columnists
American spiritual writers
American women bloggers
American women non-fiction writers
Bryan College alumni
Christian bloggers
Infectious disease deaths in Tennessee
Journalists from Alabama
People from Dayton, Tennessee
American women columnists
Writers from Birmingham, Alabama
Writers from Tennessee
Former evangelicals
American left-wing activists